Warcha salt mine is an active salt mine located in village Warcha, Khushab District of Punjab, Pakistan, with over 1 billion tonnes reserves of 98% pure (on-average), transparent and crystalline Sodium chloride salt. Warcha salt mine was launched in 1872, and is still producing over 200,000 tons of rock salt annually with capacity to doubling up its productions.

History 
During the Mughal era, Warcha was a princely state ruled by phulial family, a sub caste of Awan tribe. The ruler of the state was called the Chief of Warcha. Nawab Surkhuru was the last Chief of Warcha. In 1834, after the end of Mughal Empire, Sardar Hari Singh Nalwan, the Commander in Chief of Sikh Army conquered and took control of Warcha including all local mines.

In 1860s, the British government took over the Warcha. And they gave administrative control of all local mines to the Excise and Custom Department of British India, which for the first time introduced the room and pillar mining method in the Warcha. They later started development of the main mine in 1868, which started production in 1872.

In 1962, Warcha salt mine was handed over to the West Pakistan Industrial Development Corporation. And since 1974, it is owned and managed by the Pakistan Mineral Development Corporation.

See also 
 List of mines in Pakistan
 Khewra Salt Mine

References 

Mines in Pakistan
Salt mines in Pakistan